Kau Wa Keng, or Kau Wah Keng or Kau Wa Kang, is a village and valley in Lai King,  Hong Kong. It is located near the reclaimed Lai Chi Kok Bay in New Kowloon. Three rivers in the valley once joined at the bay and formed a beach at the estuary. Kau Wah Keng is the former site of Lai Chi Kok Amusement Park, which was closed in 1997.

Although the valley is closer to suburbs of Cheung Sha Wan, namely the community of Lai Chi Kok and Mei Foo, it traditionally and administratively belongs to Kwai Chung.

Administration
Kau Wa Keng is a recognized villages under the New Territories Small House Policy. It is one of the villages represented within the Tsuen Wan Rural Committee. For electoral purposes, Kau Wa Keng is part of the Lai Wah constituency, which was formerly represented by Steve Cheung Kwan-kiu until his resignation in July 2021.

Villages
The village of Kau Wa Keng is built on the eastern side of valley with cultivation besides the rivers. An ancestral hall and the Yeung Ching School are located in the village. It was formerly known as Kau Pa Keng, which means dog climbing path. It was later renamed to the current Kau Wa Keng, (literally, "Ninth beautiful path"). A new village Kau Wa Keng San Tsuen is located on the western side of the valley and was built following an influx of immigrants from mainland China after World War II, and during and after Chinese Civil War.

Before the Japanese occupation of Hong Kong in 1941, the village was one of hiding place for many Chinese writers who had fled the mainland.

Transportation
Lai King Hill Road, a road following the former shore line of Kau Wa King, is the main road connecting the area to Kwai Chung and Lai Chi Kok.

Education
Kau Wa Keng is in Primary One Admission (POA) School Net 65, which includes multiple aided schools (schools operated independently of the government but funded with government money); none of the schools in the net are government schools.

References

External links

 Delineation of area of existing village Kau Wah Keng (Tsuen Wan) for election of resident representative (2019 to 2022)
 Delineation of area of existing village Kau Wah Keng San Tsuen (also known as Kau Wah San Tsuen) (Tsuen Wan) for election of resident representative (2019 to 2022)
 Antiquities Advisory Board. Historic Building Appraisal. Tsang Residence, No. 22 Kau Wa Keng Pictures
 Antiquities Advisory Board. Historic Building Appraisal. Yeung Ching Study Hall, No. 1 Kau Wa Keng Pictures
 Antiquities Advisory Board. Historic Building Appraisal. No. 39 Kau Wa Keng Pictures
 Antiquities Advisory Board. Historic Building Appraisal. No. 42 Kau Wa Keng Pictures
 Antiquities Advisory Board. Historic Building Appraisal. No. 42A Kau Wa Keng Pictures
 Antiquities Advisory Board. Historic Building Appraisal. No. 30 Kau Wa Keng Pictures
 Antiquities Advisory Board. Historic Building Appraisal. Nos. 4-5 Kau Wa Keng Pictures
 Antiquities Advisory Board. Historic Building Appraisal. No. 32 Kau Wa Keng Pictures
 Antiquities Advisory Board. Historic Building Appraisal. No. 14 Kau Wa Keng Pictures
 Antiquities Advisory Board. Historic Building Appraisal. No. 43 Kau Wa Keng Pictures
 Antiquities Advisory Board. Historic Building Appraisal. No. 15 Kau Wa Keng Pictures
 Antiquities Advisory Board. Historic Building Appraisal. No. 10 Kau Wa Keng Pictures
 Antiquities Advisory Board. Historic Building Appraisal. Yiu Kung Ancestral Hall, No. 26A Kau Wa Keng Pictures
 Antiquities Advisory Board. Historic Building Appraisal. Tsang Ancestral Hall, No. 13 Kau Wa Keng Pictures
 Antiquities Advisory Board. Historic Building Appraisal. Tsang Ancestral Hall, No. 28B Kau Wa Keng Pictures

Kwai Chung
Lai King
Valleys of Hong Kong
Villages in Kwai Tsing District, Hong Kong